Oleg Aleksandrovich Dineyev (born 30 October 1987) is a Russian former footballer.

References

Russian footballers
Russia youth international footballers
Russia under-21 international footballers
Living people
1987 births
FC Spartak Moscow players
Russian Premier League players
FC Shinnik Yaroslavl players
FC Khimki players
FC Salyut Belgorod players
Association football midfielders
FC Dynamo Bryansk players